The Medium Endurance Cutter or WMEC is a type of United States Coast Guard Cutter mainly consisting of the  Famous- and  Reliance-class cutters. These larger cutters are under control of Area Commands (Atlantic Area or Pacific Area). These cutters have adequate accommodations for crew to live on board and can do 6 to 8 week patrols.
 

There are 13 vessels in the Famous class, and 14 vessels still in active US service in the Reliance class. The Coast Guard plans to eventually phase out the vessels in both of these cutter classes and replace them with the Offshore Patrol Cutter as part of the Integrated Deepwater System Program.

History 
After World War II, the United States Coast Guard used the US Navy hull classification system. The large, sea-going cutters were classified primarily as Coast Guard gunboats (WPG), destroyer escorts (WDE), and seaplane tenders (WAVP). In 1965 the Coast Guard adopted its own designation system and these large cutters were then referred to as Coast Guard High Endurance Cutters (WHEC). The coastal cutters once known as Cruising Cutters, Second Class and then as Coast Guard patrol craft (WPC) were now Coast Guard Medium Endurance Cutters (WMEC)."

Famous-class cutter

The Famous-class vessels have hull numbers in the range from WMEC-901 through WMEC-913. Entering service in the 1980s, the Famous-class cutters were designed as replacements for the  s, and their mission profile emphasized law enforcement, particularly patrolling the newly established  exclusive economic zone.

The Coast Guard harvested weapons systems components from decommissioned s to save money. Harvesting components from four decommissioned frigates resulted in more than $24 million in cost savings, which increased with parts from more decommissioned frigates. Equipment such as the Mark 75, 76 mm/62 caliber gun mounts, gun control panels, barrels, launchers, junction boxes, and other components from decommissioned Oliver Hazard Perry-class frigates were returned to service aboard Famous-class cutters in order to extend their service lives into the 2030s.

Ships in class

Reliance-class cutter 

The Reliance-class vessels have hull numbers in the range from WMEC-615 through WMEC-630.  Entering service between 1964 and 1969, the Reliance-class cutters were meant to replace the  cutters of the Prohibition era and were the first major cutter replacement project since the  s from World War II. 

The 210s (210-foot cutters) received upgrades and modifications (in a program named "Midlife Maintenance Availability" or MMA) during the 1986 through 1990 time period.  The "A"-class cutters had their gas turbines removed, and all 210s had their stern transom exhaust systems replaced with a traditional stack.  While this modification reduced the size of the flight deck, they were still more than capable of carrying out helicopter operations. Other modifications included enlarging the superstructure area, replacing the main armament, and increasing the fire-fighting capability of the cutters. The modifications cost approximately $20 million per cutter, well above their original cost of about $3.5 million each.

Ships in class 

Courageous was decommissioned on 19 September 2001.

Durable was decommissioned on 20 September 2001. In 2003 she was transferred to the Coast Guard of the Colombian Navy as ARC Valle del Cauca (PO-44).

Notes

References 

 – HDTV documentary shows the Famous-class cutter patrolling the south coastal region of the United States in February and March 1999.